Ekstraklasa is the top division in the Polish beach soccer league.

History 
Started in 2012 as the Ekstraklasa, the competitions allow teams to compete in beach soccer in a league format over the June and July. Each season ends with a superfinal deciding the competition winner for the best six teams in Polish league.

Tournaments

Results

References

External links 
 Official site

Beach soccer in Poland
Football leagues in Poland
National beach soccer leagues